Cedano or Cedaño is a Spanish surname.

People with this surname include:

Marco Cedano (born 1951), Mexican master distiller and tequila entrepreneur
Pablo Cedano Cedano, Auxiliary Bishop emeritus of the Roman Catholic Archdiocese of Santo Domingo
Sergio Cedano, soccer player on the All-time Lancaster Rattlers roster
Federico Monteverde Cedano, from the List of governors of Melilla
Marcelino Cedano, delegate to the Constitutional Congress of Querétaro for Tepic Territory
Ramón Emilio Cedaño, a Dominican boxer who fought Jonathan Guzmán, Emmanuel Rodríguez and Jonathan González
Rafael Antonio Julian Cedano, head of mission from the Dominican Republic to Bolivia and Peru
Darío Cedano, Colombian cyclist in the 1998 Vuelta a Colombia, 2001 Clásico RCN
John Zair Cedano, Colombian cyclist in the 2005 Clásico RCN

See also
Cedeño (disambiguation)
Sedano (disambiguation)